Live in Japan is a live album by B. B. King recorded in Sankei Hall, Tokyo on March 4 and 7, 1971 and released 1971 only in Japan as double LP. It was reissued 1999 for the first time outside Japan.

Track listing 

"Every Day I Have the Blues" - 2:10
"How Blue Can You Get?" - 5:17
"Eyesight to the Blind" - 4:03
"Niji Baby" - 6:27
"You're Still My Woman" - 5:56
"Chains and Things" - 5:41
"Sweet Sixteen" - 6:00
"Hummingbird" - 4:08
"Darlin' You Know I Love You" - 4:26
"Japanese Boogie" - 9:17
"Jamming at Sankei Hall" - 9:35
"The Thrill Is Gone" - 5:36
"Hikari #88" - 7:57

Personnel
B.B. King - guitar, vocals
Wilbert Freeman - bass
Ron Levy - piano
Sonny Freeman - drums
Earl Turbington, Louis Hubert - saxophone
Joe Burton - trombone
John Browning - trumpet

References

B.B. King live albums
1999 live albums
MCA Records live albums